Acacia exudans, also known as Casterton wattle,  is a  shrub species that is endemic to Australia. The species was formally described by English botanist John Lindley in 1838 from material collected on Thomas Mitchell's expedition near Casterton, Victoria in 1836. The description was published in Mitchell's  Three Expeditions into the interior of Eastern Australia.

Acacia exudans was previously known as Acacia verniciflua but is since 1996 treated as a separate species.

References

exudans
Flora of Victoria (Australia)
Fabales of Australia